Haicheng West railway station is a railway station in Haicheng, Anshan, Liaoning, China. It opened along with the Harbin–Dalian high-speed railway on 1 December 2012.

References

Railway stations in Liaoning
Railway stations in China opened in 2012
Stations on the Panjin–Yingkou High-Speed Railway
Haicheng, Liaoning